The Chain Gang is a collection of books written by English illustrator and author Robin Lawrie and his wife Christine Lawrie.  The series follows the adventures of a group of young mountain bikers.

The Books 

 Muddy Mayhem  
 Chain Reaction  
 Winged Avenger  
 Fear 3.1 
 Shock Tactics  
 White Lightning  
 Cheat Challenge  
 2 Xc 4 my Shirt  
 Snow Bored  
 Return Descender  
 Block Busters  
 Sweet Revenge  
 Paintball Panic  
 Radar Riders  
 First Among Losers  
 Ballerina Biker   
 Gone Green  
 Treetop Trauma

American Versions (Ridge Riders) 
The chain gang series was re-branded by American Publisher stone arch in 2007 who renamed the series "ridge riders".

References

Series of children's books
2010s books